Kenneth Edward Greene (born May 8, 1956) is a former professional American football player who played safety in the National Football League (NFL) for seven seasons, for the St. Louis Cardinals (1978–1982) and San Diego Chargers (1983–1984).

Born in Lewiston, Idaho, Greene graduated from Omak High School in 1974 and played college football at Washington State University in the Pacific-8 Conference.  He was selected in the first round of the 1978 NFL Draft (19th overall), the Cougars' first selection in the first round in thirteen years. 

He appeared in the 13th season of The Amazing Race. His partner was his wife, Tina Greene. The goal on the race was to try to mend their broken marriage. They finished the race in 2nd place and ultimately lost the $1 Million grand prize and The Amazing Race 13 winners' title to the brother and sister team of Nick and Starr, but agreed to give their marriage another try.

Coaching career
Greene began coaching football in 1994, at Vallivue High School in southwestern Idaho. Greene later coached at Fresno State University, Purdue University, and Washington State University.

References

External links
Washington State Coach

1956 births
Living people
American football safeties
People from Lewiston, Idaho
San Diego Chargers players
St. Louis Cardinals (football) players
The Amazing Race (American TV series) contestants
Washington State Cougars football players
Fresno State Bulldogs football coaches
Purdue Boilermakers football coaches
Washington State Cougars football coaches
Players of American football from Idaho